Cornell Duane Green (born August 25, 1976) is a former American football offensive tackle. He was signed by the Atlanta Falcons as an undrafted free agent in 1999. He played college football at the University of Central Florida where he was a four-year starter at offensive tackle. He played high school football at Pinellas Lakewood High.

Green has also been a member of the New York Jets, Miami Dolphins, Denver Broncos, Tampa Bay Buccaneers, Buffalo Bills and Oakland Raiders. During his first of two stints with the Buccaneers, he earned a Super Bowl ring in Super Bowl XXXVII.

College career
Green was a teammate of future NFL quarterback Daunte Culpepper at the University of Central Florida. The two would be teammates again in 2007 with the Oakland Raiders.

Professional career
Green signed with the Buffalo Bills on March 8, 2010.

References

External links
Denver Broncos bio
Oakland Raiders bio

1976 births
Living people
Players of American football from St. Petersburg, Florida
American football offensive tackles
UCF Knights football players
Atlanta Falcons players
Washington Redskins players
New York Jets players
Miami Dolphins players
Scottish Claymores players
Tampa Bay Buccaneers players
Denver Broncos players
Oakland Raiders players
Buffalo Bills players